Robert Stuart (1887–1959) was an Australian rugby union and rugby league footballer and represented his country at both sports - a dual-code rugby international.

Born in Annandale, New South Wales, Stuart represented for the Wallabies as a flanker in the drawn two Test series in 1910 against the touring All Blacks.

After switching to the professional code in 1911 he was selected to tour Great Britain with the 1911–12 Kangaroo tour of Great Britain led by Chris McKivat. He played in two tour matches. Stuart is listed on the Australian Players Register as Kangaroo No. 84.
 
Along with Charles McMurtie and Peter Burge, Stuart made his international league debut in a 1911 tour match but did not play in any Tests. Collectively they are likely to have been Australia's 17th to 19th dual code rugby internationals.

Robert Stuart had five children and lived in Drummoyne NSW.

References

Sources
 Andrews, Malcolm (2006) The ABC of Rugby League, Austn Broadcasting Corpn, Sydney
 Whiticker, Alan & Hudson, Glen (2006) The Encyclopedia of Rugby League Players, Gavin Allen Publishing, Sydney
 Whiticker, Alan (2004) Captaining the Kangaroos, New Holland, Sydney

                   

1887 births
Australian rugby league players
Dual-code rugby internationals
Australian rugby union players
Annandale rugby league players
Australia national rugby league team players
1959 deaths
Australia international rugby union players
Australasia rugby league team players
Rugby union flankers
Rugby league players from Sydney
Rugby union players from Sydney